Phase 1, Phase I or Phase One may refer to:

Media 
 Marvel Cinematic Universe: Phase One, six American superhero films from 2008–2012
 Phase One (Art Ensemble of Chicago album), 1971
 Phase One (Saga album), 1998
 Phase One, renamed Bloodwork (film), a 2012 American-Canadian thriller

Other 
 Phase I clinical trials, the first of the phases of clinical research
 Canadian Phase I, a powered parachute design
 Phase I metabolism, Phase I reaction in drug metabolism
 Phase I environmental site assessment, a report prepared for a real estate holding which identifies potential or existing environmental contamination liabilities
 Phase 1 (bar), a lesbian bar and nightclub at 525 8th Street, Southeast in Washington, D.C
 Phase One (company), a Danish camera equipment company
 Phase 1 metro station
 Phase One Media Pro
 Phase One Endurance

See also
 Phase (disambiguation)